Laar is a hamlet in the Dutch province of North Brabant. It is located in the municipality of Nuenen, Gerwen en Nederwetten, 2 km north of the town of Nuenen, just northwest of Gerwen.

Laar is not a statistical entity, and the postal authorities have placed it under Nuenen. Laar has no place name signs, and consists of about 25 houses.

It was first mentioned in 1406 as "ex bonis te laar", and means "forest pasture".

References

Populated places in North Brabant
Nuenen, Gerwen en Nederwetten